Arturo Falconi (1867–1934) was an Italian stage and film actor. He was the brother of the actor Armando Falconi and uncle of the director Dino Falconi.

Selected filmography
 The Gift of the Morning (1932)
 Zaganella and the Cavalier (1932)
 The Last of the Bergeracs (1934)
 Kiki (1934)
 The Three-Cornered Hat (1935)

References

Bibliography
 Goble, Alan. The Complete Index to Literary Sources in Film. Walter de Gruyter, 1999.

External links

1867 births
1934 deaths
Italian male stage actors
Italian male film actors
Male actors from Naples